Sjursen is a surname. Notable people with the surname include:
 Jann Sjursen (born 1963), Danish teacher and politician
 Robert Sjursen (1891–1965), Norwegian gymnast
 Amund Høie Sjursen (born 1996), Norwegian athletics competitor
 , Norwegian politician and economist